Take a Girl Like You is a 2000 British television comedy series adapted by Andrew Davies from the 1960 novel Take a Girl Like You by Kingsley Amis. It starred Sienna Guillory, Rupert Graves, Hugh Bonneville, Robert Daws, Leslie Phillips, Emma Chambers, Ian Driver and Deborah Cornelius. It was broadcast on BBC1 in three hour-long episodes directed by Nick Hurran.

References

BBC television dramas
Television shows written by Andrew Davies
2000 British television series debuts
2000 British television series endings
2000s British drama television series
British comedy-drama television shows
2000s British television miniseries
Television shows based on British novels
Films based on works by Kingsley Amis
English-language television shows
Television shows set in Surrey